Due lettere anonime, internationally released as Two Anonymous Letters, is a 1945 Italian war-melodrama film directed by Mario Camerini.

For this film Andrea Checchi won a Silver Ribbon for Best Actor.

Cast 
 Clara Calamai: Gina
 Andrea Checchi: Bruno
 Otello Toso: Tullio
 Carlo Ninchi: Rossini
 Dina Sassoli: Giulia
 Giovanna Scotto: Maria, la madre di Bruno
 Arnaldo Martelli: cavalier Ernesto Pacetti
 Stefano Fossari: tenente
 Heinrich Bode: sergente Karl
 Vittorio Duse: Ettore
 Pina Piovani: operaia della tipografia

References

External links

1945 films
Italian war drama films
Films directed by Mario Camerini
Italian black-and-white films
1940s war drama films
1945 drama films
Films scored by Alessandro Cicognini
Italian World War II films
1940s Italian films